Awakening!! is an album by alto saxophonist Jimmy Woods which was recorded in late 1961 and early 1962 and released on the Contemporary label.

Reception

Allmusic awarded the album 4½ stars with its review by Scott Yanow stating: "Jimmy Woods' original sound and passionate, chance-taking style make one wonder why he was never able to really make it; his music has not really dated".

Track listing 
All compositions by Jimmy Woods except as indicated
 "Awakening" - 4:10
 "Circus" (Louis Alter, Bob Russell) - 4:25
 "Not Yet" - 7:59
 "A New Twist" - 3:40
 "Love for Sale" (Cole Porter) - 6:42
 "Roma" - 5:15
 "Little Jim" - 5:48
 "Anticipation" - 4:01 
Recorded in Los Angeles, California, on September 13, 1961, (tracks 1, 2, 4, 5 & 8) and February 19, 1962 (tracks 3, 6 & 7)

Personnel 
Jimmy Woods - alto saxophone
Martin Banks, Joe Gordon - trumpet (tracks 1, 2, 4, 5 & 8)
Amos Trice (tracks 1, 2, 4, 5 & 8), Dick Whittington (tracks 3, 6 & 7) - piano
Jimmy Bond (tracks 1, 2, 4, 5 & 8), Gary Peacock (tracks 3, 6 & 7) - bass
Milt Turner - drums

References 

Jimmy Woods albums
1962 albums
Contemporary Records albums